Conall Collamrach, son of Eterscél Temrach, son of Eochaid Ailtlethan, was, according to medieval Irish legend and historical tradition, a High King of Ireland. He succeeded to the throne on the death of his uncle Óengus Tuirmech Temrach, and ruled for five years, until he was killed by Nia Segamain. The Lebor Gabála synchronises his reign with that of Ptolemy VIII Physcon in Egypt (145–116 BC). The chronology of Geoffrey Keating's Foras Feasa ar Éirinn dates his reign to 232–226 BC, that of the Annals of the Four Masters to 326–320 BC.

References

Legendary High Kings of Ireland
3rd-century BC rulers
3rd-century BC murdered monarchs